WGLT is a public radio station owned by Illinois State University and broadcasting on 89.1 MHz at Normal, Illinois. It broadcasts primarily local news and NPR programs, plus music in the evenings and on weekends.

The station's studio is in the Old Union building on the campus of Illinois State University.  Its callsign comes from the motto of Illinois State University: "Gladly we Learn and Teach", originally "and gladly wold he lerne and gladly teche", from line 309 of The Canterbury Tales.

History
WGLT signed on the air on February 6, 1966, with only 10 watts of power and a studio in Cook Hall. It was originally student-run and heard only in the dorms.  WGLT increased power to 2,300 watts and became a full-powered NPR station in July 1976, and increased power to 25,000 watts effective radiated power and adopted jazz as its daytime format in August 1992.

On August 5, 2013, WGLT dropped jazz programming from its daytime schedule to concentrate on news/talk full time. Its marquee daily newsmagazine show is "Sound Ideas," airing every weekday.

In April 2019, Illinois State University and Bradley University signed an agreement in which WGLT assumed operations of WCBU in Peoria starting June 1, 2019. WGLT's translator signal at 103.5 FM in Peoria, which had simulcast WGLT's signal, will simulcast WCBU-HD2's classical music format.

Over the decades, WGLT News has been honored with scores of regional and national awards for excellence by the Associated Press, Kaleidoscope, Public Radio News Directors, Inc and the prestigious Edward R. Murrow awards from the Radio Television Digital News Association.

Programs
WGLT's flagship local news program is "Sound Ideas," which airs weekdays at 5 p.m. "Sound Ideas" features interviews with newsmakers and artists.

WGLT was among the first small NPR member-stations to launch a daily news podcast, called "WGLT's The Leadoff." It's available on all major podcast platforms.

WGLT's music service is "Highway 309." The eclectic format encompasses WGLT's deep history with blues and folk while including pop, soul, gospel, Americana, and country, and seasoned with a dash of adult rock. It's available as a music stream 24/7 or weekends on-air at 89.1 FM.

References

External links
WGLT — official site

GLT
Illinois State University
WGLT
NPR member stations
GLT
Radio stations established in 1966
1966 establishments in Illinois